Segi or SEGI may refer to:

Aiki Segi (born 1991), a Japanese professional footballer
Hwarang Segi, a Korean historical book
Naoki Segi, Japanese director
Patrick Segi (born 1980), a New Zealand-born Samoan former rugby union player
Segi (organization), a Basque organization
SEGi University College, a university college in Malaysia
SEGI (France), French owners of rolling stock
Seghe, Solomon Islands (other spelling)